Clarksdale may refer to some places in the United States:

Clarksdale, Illinois, unincorporated community in Christian County
Clarksdale, Indiana, unincorporated community in Brown County
Clarksdale, Mississippi, city in Coahoma County
Clarksdale, Missouri, city in DeKalb County

See also
 Clarkdale (disambiguation)